Thomas B. Barlow (July 9, 1896 in Trenton, New Jersey – September 26, 1983 in Lakehurst, New Jersey) was an American professional basketball player. He is mostly known for his time with the Philadelphia Sphas and Philadelphia Warriors of the ABL (1926–32). He was inducted into the Naismith Memorial Basketball Hall of Fame in 1981.

External links
 Basketball Hall of Fame profile

Notes 

1896 births
1983 deaths
People from Lakehurst, New Jersey
Naismith Memorial Basketball Hall of Fame inductees
Basketball players from Trenton, New Jersey
Philadelphia Warriors (ABL) players
Philadelphia Sphas players
Sportspeople from Ocean County, New Jersey
American men's basketball players
20th-century American Jews